Živana Antonijević or Blind Živana (died in Zemun in 1828) was Serbian storyteller, gusle player and one of the most important sources for Serbian epic poetry recorded by Vuk Karadžić.

Živana was one of favorite women singers of Vuk Karadžić who published seven songs recorded from her:
 How the Christened name is served
 He who celebrates the Christened name is helped by it
 Marko Kraljević and Alil-Aga
 Marko Kraljević and the twelve Moors
 Perilous Bogdan and voivode Dragija
 Vučko Ljubičić 
 Nahod Momir

Some other songs are also recorded from her, including:

 Marko and the vila 
 The unfaithful wife of Grujica  
 The Wedding of Todor of Stalać

Jelisaveta Marković (Blind Jeca), who was also a blind storyteller (one of four whose songs were recorded by Karadžić) was Živana's apprentice.

References 

1770s births
1822 deaths
Serbian women poets
18th-century Serbian people
19th-century Serbian people
18th-century Serbian women
19th-century Serbian women
Serbian guslars